William John George Evans VC (16 February 1876 – 28 September 1937) was an English recipient of the Victoria Cross, the highest and most prestigious award for gallantry in the face of the enemy that can be awarded to British and Commonwealth forces.

Evans first joined the Scots Guards in March 1894, and served during the Second Boer War. He left the Army in August 1902, to work for the NSPCC, and rejoined in January 1915. When he was 40 years old, and a Company Sergeant-Major in the 18th Battalion (3rd Manchester Pals), The Manchester Regiment of the British Army during the First World War, Evans was awarded the Victoria Cross for his deeds on 30 July 1916 during the Battle of the Somme at Guillemont, France:

Company Sergeant-Major Evans volunteered to take back an important message after five runners had been killed in attempting to do so. He had to cover about 700 yards, the whole of which was under observation from the enemy. He succeeded in delivering the message in spite of being wounded, and then rejoined his company despite having been advised to go to the dressing station. The return journey had again meant facing 700 yards of severe rifle and machine-gun fire, but by dodging from shell-hole to shell-hole he managed it.

Evans was captured following his VC action, and spent the rest of the war as a POW. His Victoria Cross, gazetted in January 1920, was the last to be gazetted for the First World War.

He died on 28 September 1937 and was buried with full military honours in Elmers End Cemetery, Beckenham.

His VC medal group are still held by his family and are loaned to the Imperial War Museum in London where they are on display in the Lord Ashcroft VC/GC Gallery.

References

Monuments to Courage (David Harvey, 1999)
The Register of the Victoria Cross (This England, 1997)
VCs of the First World War - The Somme (Gerald Gliddon, 1994)

External links

Location of grave and VC medal (S.E. London)
 

British Battle of the Somme recipients of the Victoria Cross
Manchester Regiment soldiers
British Army personnel of World War I
People from Kensington
1876 births
1937 deaths
Burials in Kent
World War I prisoners of war held by Germany
British World War I prisoners of war
British Army personnel of the Second Boer War
Scots Guards soldiers
Military personnel from London
British Army recipients of the Victoria Cross
British World War I recipients of the Victoria Cross
Military personnel from Middlesex
National Society for the Prevention of Cruelty to Children people